Klyuchi is a rural locality (a village) in Vereshchaginsky District, Perm Krai, Russia. The population was 100 as of 2010.

Geography 
Klyuchi is located 28 km west of Vereshchagino (the district's administrative centre) by road. Putino is the nearest rural locality.

References 

Rural localities in Vereshchaginsky District